Enrico Patrizio (born 15 January 1985) is an Italian rugby union footballer who plays for Mogliano in the Top12. Enrico Patrizio's position of choice is at centre.

He made his debut for Italy against Uruguay on 2 June 2007.

References

External links
RBS 6 Nations profile

1985 births
Living people
Italian rugby union players
Italy international rugby union players
Rugby union centres